The 21st congressional district of Illinois was a congressional district for the United States House of Representatives in Illinois.  It was eliminated as a result of the 1990 Census. It was last represented by Jerry Costello who was redistricted into the 12th district.

List of members representing the district

References 

 Congressional Biographical Directory of the United States 1774–present

Former congressional districts of the United States
21
1895 establishments in Illinois
Constituencies established in 1895
1993 disestablishments in Illinois
Constituencies disestablished in 1993